Soul Call is an album by guitarist Kenny Burrell recorded in 1964 and released on the Prestige label.

Reception

Allmusic awarded the album 3 stars with the review by Scott Yanow stating, "The music is melodic and boppish, although no real surprises occur. By this time, Burrell was a very respectful player, upholding the tradition rather than offering any real innovations".

Track listing 
All compositions by Kenny Burrell except where noted
 "I'm Just a Lucky So-and-So" (Mack David, Duke Ellington) - 5:15     
 "Mark One" (Will Davis) - 7:11     
 "A Sleepin' Bee" (Harold Arlen, Truman Capote) - 4:26     
 "Soul Call" - 7:22     
 "Kenny's Theme" - 5:00     
 "Here's That Rainy Day" (Johnny Burke, Jimmy Van Heusen) - 4:16     
 "Oh Henry" (Gil Fuller, Ernie Henry) - 3:03

Personnel 
Kenny Burrell - guitar
Will Davis - piano 
Martin Rivera - bass 
Bill English - drums
Ray Barretto - congas

References 

Kenny Burrell albums
1964 albums
Albums produced by Ozzie Cadena
Albums recorded at Van Gelder Studio
Prestige Records albums